is a Japanese women's professional shogi player ranked 1-kyū.

Promotion history
Sasaki's promotion history is as follows.

 2-kyū: December 1, 2021
 1-kyū: February 7, 2022

Note: All ranks are women's professional ranks.

References

External links
 ShogiHub: Sasaki, Minori

2005 births
Living people
People from Ibaraki, Osaka
Japanese shogi players
Women's professional shogi players
Professional shogi players from Osaka Prefecture